Evan Weinger (born April 18, 1997) is an American professional ice hockey winger who is currently playing with the  San Diego Gulls of the American Hockey League (AHL). As an undrafted player, he was signed out of major junior hockey by the San Jose Sharks organization.

Playing career

Amateur
Weinger was born on April 18, 1997, in Los Angeles, California. He began his minor hockey career with the Los Angeles Jr. Kings in the Tier 1 Elite Hockey League before being drafted in the 13th round of the 2012 Western Hockey League (WHL) by the Portland Winterhawks. He remained with the Jr. Kings for the 2013–14 season, recording 12 goals and 14 assists, before signing with the Winterhawks. During his rookie season, Career led team rookies in scoring with seven goals and 19 assists for 26 points in 61 games. As a result, he was ranked 161st amongst North American skaters by the NHL Central Scouting Bureau prior to the 2015 NHL Entry Draft.

After going undrafted into the NHL twice, Weinger was signed to an Amateur tryout contract by his hometown Los Angeles Kings and participated in their 2017 training camp. Upon being returned to the WHL, Weinger was traded to the Brandon Wheat Kings in exchange for a third round draft choice in the 2018 WHL Bantam Draft on October 10, 2017. At the time of the trade, Weinger had played in 187 regular season games and amassed 37 goals, 89 points and 97 penalty minutes. During the 2017–18 season, Weinger recorded 50 points in 55 games and signed an American Hockey League (AHL) contract with the San Jose Barracuda to begin his professional career.

Professional
In his first professional season in San Jose, Weinger played in 60 games and recorded 22 points while also spending time on their top-10 penalty killing unit. When the Barracuda qualified for the 2018 Calder Cup playoffs, he played in four games and tied the team lead in points with four. Following his rookie season, Weinger signed a one-year contract extension on May 28, 2019.

During the shortened 2019–20 season, Weinger led the team in shorthanded goals and points-per-game, and finished second on the team in Plus–minus with +12. As a result of his second successful season, Weinger signed another contract extension to remain with the Barracuda. While the league was paused due to the COVID-19 pandemic, Weinger was loaned to the HC TPS in the Liiga. He played in nine games for the team, recording one goal, before returning to the AHL. On February 13, 2021, Weinger played in his 100th career AHL game.

Career statistics

References

External links

1997 births
Living people
American men's ice hockey right wingers
Brandon Wheat Kings players
Ice hockey people from Los Angeles
Portland Winterhawks players
San Diego Gulls (AHL) players
San Jose Barracuda players
HC TPS players
Tulsa Oilers (1992–present) players